Bruchia elegans is a species of haplolepideous mosses (Dicranidae) in the family Bruchiaceae.

References

External links
 Bruchia elegans at The Plant List
 Bruchia elegans at Tropicos

Dicranales
Plants described in 1847